The INAS 561 is the Naval Helicopter Training School of the Indian Navy is currently based at INS Rajali, Arakkonam.

References 

Aircraft squadrons of the Indian Navy
Military units and formations established in 1971